Lomatium fusiformis, synonym Orogenia fusiformis, is a species of flowering plant in the carrot family. It is known by the common name California Indian potato. It is native to the western United States from California to Montana, where it grows in high mountains in rocky, gravelly habitat.

It is a small perennial herb growing from a carrot-like tuber up to a centimeter wide. Leaves are located around the base of the plant, each with a blade made up of a few linear lobes a few centimeters in length. There is usually no stem but the inflorescence arises on a stemlike peduncle up to about 15 centimeters tall. The inflorescence is a compound umbel bearing many tiny white flowers with dark anthers.

The fruit is an ovoid body a few millimeters long lined with prominent longitudinal ribs.

References

External links
Jepson Manual Treatment - Orogenia fusiformis
USDA Plants Profile: Orogenia fusiformis
Orogenia fusiformis - Photo gallery

Apioideae
Flora of California
Flora of Oregon
Flora of Idaho
Flora of Montana
Flora of the Sierra Nevada (United States)
Flora of the Rocky Mountains
Flora without expected TNC conservation status